San José de Chiquitos or simply San José is the capital of Chiquitos Province in the Santa Cruz Department, Bolivia. It is known as part of the Jesuit Missions of the Chiquitos, which is declared in 1990 a World Heritage Site, as a former Jesuit Reduction.

The ruins of the mission of San Juan Bautista, one of the Jesuit Missions of the Chiquitos, lie near the village of San Juan de Taperas in San José de Chiquitos Municipality.

History
In 1698, the mission of San José was founded by Jesuit missionaries Felipe Suárez and Fr. Dionisio Ávila. The mission hosted the Penoqui Indians.

Languages
Today, Camba Spanish is the most commonly used everyday language. In the past, the Penoqui dialect of Chiquitano was spoken at the mission of San José de Chiquitos.

See also
 List of Jesuit sites
 List of the Jesuit Missions of Chiquitos

References

External links 

 
 Map of Chiquitos Province
 Description of Jesuit mission (World Heritage Site) with pictures and information

Populated places in Santa Cruz Department (Bolivia)
World Heritage Sites in Bolivia
Jesuit Missions of Chiquitos